16th Nova Scotia general election may refer to:

Nova Scotia general election, 1840, the 16th general election to take place in the Colony of Nova Scotia, for the 16th General Assembly of Nova Scotia
1928 Nova Scotia general election, the 38th overall general election for Nova Scotia, for the (due to a counting error in 1859) 39th Legislative Assembly of Nova Scotia, but considered the 16th general election for the Canadian province of Nova Scotia.